Dievča do dažďa (Rainy Day Girl) is the debut solo album by Slovak singer-songwriter Marika Gombitová, released on OPUS in 1979.

Track listing

Official releases
 1979: Dievča do dažďa, LP, MC, OPUS, #9116 0858
 1995: Dievča do dažďa, CD, re-release, Open Music #0024 2331
 2000: Dievča do dažďa: Komplet 1, 6 bonus tracks, CD, Sony Music Bonton, No. 49 7691
 2003: Dievča do dažďa: Komplet 1, 6 bonus tracks, CD, No. 91 0858
 2008: Dievča do dažďa: 2CD Collectors Edition, bonus CD (export release), OPUS, No. 91 2791

Credits and personnel

 Marika Gombitová – lead vocal
 Ján Lehotský – lead vocal, writer, keyboards
 Ladislav Lučenič – writer, bass, acoustic guitar, back vocal
 Cyril Zeleňák – drums, percussion
 František Griglák – solo guitar, synthesizer
 Ľubomír Tamaškovič – tenox sax
 Pavol Hammel – writer, acoustic guitar,
 Viliam Pobjecký – solo guitar
 Kamil Peteraj – lyrics, notes
 M Tadla – string group conductor

 Ján Lauko – music director
 Milan Vašica – music director
 Tibor Borský – photography
 Ivan Minárik – technical collaboration
 Jozef Hanák – technical collaboration
 Zoro Laurinc – lyrics (bonus track 14, Komplet 1)
 Vlasta Brezovská – lyrics (bonus track 15, Komplet 1)
 Peter Brhlovič – lyrics (bonus track 16, Komplet 1)

Legacy
In 2007, Dievča do dažďa placed 20th on the list of the 100 Greatest Slovak Albums of All Time.

Export release

The export version of the album, entitled Rainy Day Girl, was issued in 1981.

Track listing

Official releases
 1981: Rainy Day Girl, LP, MC, OPUS, #9116 0973
 2008: Dievča do dažďa: 2CD Collectors Edition, bonus CD (export release), OPUS, No. 91 2791

Additional credits and personnel
 Peter Saller – English transcription

References

General

Specific

External links 
 

1979 debut albums
1981 albums
Marika Gombitová albums